Palomar Medical Center Poway is a hospital in Poway, California, operated by Palomar Health. It opened in 1977.

Name
The hospital takes its name, like other entities in the area, from a portmanteau of surrounding placenames: Poway, Merton (former town), and Rancho Bernardo.

See also
Palomar Medical Center

References

External links
Pomerado Hospital
Palomar Pomerado Health
This hospital in the CA Healthcare Atlas A project by OSHPD

Hospitals in San Diego County, California
Poway, California
Hospital buildings completed in 1977